The College of Education and Human Development (CEHD) is one of seventeen colleges and professional schools at the University of Minnesota. CEHD departments are located on both the East Bank and St. Paul campuses.

The college was founded in 1905 as the Department of Pedagogy. In 2006 the College of Education and Human Development became part of a newly organized college that now includes the former General College (Department of Postsecondary Teaching and Learning) and two units of the former College of Human Ecology (the School of Social Work and the Department of Family Social Science).

As of fall 2017 it enrolled 4,823 students. Living alumni total more than 70,000. The 2017 Academic Ranking of World Universities listed CEHD as the top public school of education in the world. U.S. News & World Report in its 2016 Best Grad School rankings rated University of Minnesota's CEHD No. 11 among public institutions and tied for twenty-first overall.

Mission
The College of Education and Human Development is a leader in discovering, creating, sharing, and applying principles and practices of multiculturalism and multidisciplinary scholarship to advance teaching and learning and to enhance the psychological, physical, and social development of children, youth, and adults across the lifespan in families, organizations, and communities. The mission of the University of Minnesota College of Education and Human Development is to contribute to a just and sustainable future through engagement with the local and global communities to enhance human learning and development at all stages of the life span.

Degrees granted
1,644 degrees granted during 2016-17 (760 B.S., 502 M.Ed., 382 masters and advanced graduate degrees). In addition, 387 students completed post baccalaureate teacher licensure.

Administration
Michael C. Rodriguez, Dean

Nicola Alexander, Associate Dean for Undergraduate Education, Diversity, and International Initiatives

Tabitha Grier-Reed, Associate Dean for Graduate Education and Faculty Development

Frank Symons, Associate Dean for Research and Policy

Gail Renteria, Chief Financial Officer and Chief of Operations

Mani Vang, Director of Human Resources

Ryan Warren, Chief Innovation and Partnership Officer

Departments
Curriculum and Instruction
Educational Psychology
Family Social Science
Institute of Child Development
Organizational Leadership, Policy, and Development
School of Kinesiology
School of Social Work

Collegewide Research Centers
Center for Applied Research and Educational Improvement
Center for Early Education and Development
Institute on Community Integration
Learning Technologies Media Lab
Minnesota Center for Reading Research
STEM Education Center
University of Minnesota Child Development Center

Publications
CEHD News site
CEHD Vision2020 site
Connect alumni magazine

References

External links
College of Education and Human Development official Web site.

University of Minnesota
Schools of education in Minnesota
Educational institutions established in 1905
1905 establishments in Minnesota